Canute J. Curtis (born August 4, 1974) is a former American college and professional football player who was a linebacker in the National Football League (NFL) for six seasons during the 1990s and early 2000s.  He played college football for West Virginia University, where he was a consensus All-American.  He was drafted in the 1997 NFL Draft, and played professionally for the Cincinnati Bengals.  Curtis is a former defensive line coach at Towson University.

Early years
Curtis was born in Amityville, New York.  He attended Farmingdale High School in Farmingdale, New York, where he played for the Farmingdale high school football team.

College career
Curtis attended West Virginia University, where he played for the West Virginia Mountaineers football team from 1993 to 1996.  As a senior in 1996, Curtis led the nation's top-ranked defense by setting the Mountaineers' single-season record for quarterback sacks with 16.5, and also made 11 tackles for a loss.  He totaled 67 tackles, forced two fumbles, and had an interception.  Curtis was recognized as a consensus first-team All-American, and was named the Big East Conference Defensive Player of the Year.  He was also among the finalists for the Dick Butkus Award for best college linebacker and for the Bronko Nagurski Award for best college defensive player.

Curtis finished his career as WVU's all-time sack leader with 33.5 sacks.

He also became a member of Alpha Phi Alpha fraternity.

Professional career
During his six-season pro career, he played in 70 regular season games, started 15 of them, and compiled 87 tackles.

References

1974 births
Living people
All-American college football players
American football linebackers
Cincinnati Bengals players
People from Amityville, New York
Towson Tigers football coaches
West Virginia Mountaineers football players
People from Farmingdale, New York
Farmingdale High School alumni